The Society for the Advancement of Central and Eastern European Cultures (SACEEC colloquially) is a student managed not-for-profit organization of the University of Colorado in Boulder. The Society is dedicated to the historical, geopolitical, and cultural contributions of the 21 nations of Central and Eastern Europe.  SACEEC hosts variable cultural events, seminar speakers, a film festival, and maintains an online newsletter.  Film critic Roger Ebert and the United States Embassy in Bratislava, Slovakia, are Friends of the Society.  Between January 2005 and December 2006, the Web site generated 150,000 hits.

About
The society was founded by Central and East European Historian Jack Hanley in 2005 to fill the knowledge gap of its member nations and the university community.  SACEEC is a plural society committed to the growth, advocacy, and dissemination of C&E European affairs and to improving society by educational and cultural means.

SACEEC's missions are to advance and promote the historical, cultural, and collective experiences of Central and Eastern European nations; to recognize their re-emergence and relevance on the contemporary geo-political landscape; and to celebrate their diversity and enriching contributions to the cultures, philosophies, and histories upon the narrative of civilization.

Member Nations
Nations currently maintained by SACEEC include:

External links
 Official Website of SACEEC

SACEEC
SACEEC
Organizations established in 2003